Pseuderemias smithii, also known commonly as Smith's  racerunner or Smith's sand racer, is a species of lizard in the family Lacertidae. The species is native to East Africa.

Etymology
P. smithii is named after Arthur Donaldson Smith, who was an American physician and traveller.

Geographic range
P. smithii is found in Ethiopia, Kenya, and Somalia.

Reproduction
P. smithii is oviparous.

References

Further reading
Boulenger GA (1895). "An Account of the Reptiles and Batrachians collected by Dr. A. Donaldson Smith in Western Somali-land and the Galla Country". Proceedings of the Zoological Society of London 1895: 530–540 + Plates XXIX & XXX. ("Eremias smithi [sic]", new species, pp. 534–535 + "Eremias smithii [sic]", Plate XXIX, figure 4).
Largen M, Spawls S (2010). The Amphibians and Reptiles of Ethiopia and Eritrea. Frankfurt am Main, Germany: Chimaira / Serpents Tale. 694 pp. (Pseuderemias smithii, p. 369).
Parker HW (1942). "The Lizards of British Somaliland". Bulletin of the Museum of Comparative Zoölogy at Harvard College 91: 1–101. ("Eremias smithi [sic]", p. 62).
Szczerbak, "Nikolai N." (1989). "Catalogue of the African Sand Lizards (Reptilia: Sauria: Eremiainae: Lampreremias, Pseuderemias, Taenieremias, Mesalina, Meroles)". Herpetozoa 1 (3/4): 119–132. (Pseuderemias smithii, p. 129).
Spawls S, Howell K, Hinkel H, Menegon M (2018). Field Guide to East African Reptiles, Second Edition. London: Bloomsbury Natural History. 624 pp. . (Pseuderemias smithii, p. 201).

Pseuderemias
Lacertid lizards of Africa
Reptiles of Ethiopia
Reptiles of Kenya
Reptiles of Somalia
Reptiles described in 1895
Taxa named by George Albert Boulenger